The 2019 Motorcycle Grand Prix of the Americas was the third round of the 2019 MotoGP season. It was held at the Circuit of the Americas in Austin on April 14, 2019.

Classification

MotoGP

Moto2

 Jake Dixon was declared unfit to start the race due to a concussion.

Moto3

Championship standings after the race

MotoGP

Moto2

Moto3

References

External links

Americas
Motorcycle Grand Prix of the Americas
Motorcycle Grand Prix of the Americas
Motorcycle Grand Prix of the Americas